Bradley Paul Farmer  (born 16 December 1959) is an Australian advocate, author and conservationist. He was awarded a Member of the Order of Australia on the 2019 Queens Birthday Honours List for a lifetime of voluntary service towards coasts, conservation and communities.  His first environmental campaign, aged 12, was on the Gold Coast where he grew up.  He continues to be an adviser of coastal conservancy in Australia and elsewhere.

Australia's tourism agency, Tourism Australia, has appointed him as a "Beach Ambassador" and as a "Friend of Australia".

Along with being widely published in journals, magazines and newspapers over four decades, he wrote his first book at 25, a Surfing Guide to Australia.  His most recent best-selling book in 2012 Australia Best 101 Beaches was a benchmark publication examining all 11,761 Australian beaches, together with co-author Emeritus Professor Andy Short OAM.   He regularly produces the only authoritative list of Australia’s Best Beaches, which in 2020 he introduced for the first time, inland beaches to include rivers and lakes.

Writing since a teen, he studied journalism and arts for only one year at the University of Southern Queensland.  He has worked, lived or travelled to over 40 countries. He joined his first political party at 14 and has been active in public affairs ever since. While his advocacy has taken him around the world extensively, from Washington DC to Canberra, he maintains a Special Projects role, a title bestowed by former Australian Democrats Leader, Senator Cheryl Kernot during his time in the Australian Parliament.  He now heads United Relations Advocacy & Special Projects.  His roles in politics have ranged from a federal policy and media adviser, departmental spokesperson to a strategic campaign tactician.  He has also held senior executive posts in ASX listed companies, particularly facilitating environmental and cross cultural relations between Sino and Aboriginal bodies.  

He founded the Gold Coast Greens with the famed environmentalist Dr Bob Brown in 1993 and achieved a record result in his first political campaign in the seat of Currumbin, Queensland, site of the Farmer Family Park, he considers this his home region.  He is the founder of many not-for-profit groups and initiatives including Surfrider Foundation Australia and Ocean Care Day.  

He was instrumental in the formation of Coastcare as a founding adviser on the Federal Marine and Coastal Community Network.  He introduced World Surfing Reserves in California in 2009 modelled on his successful 1993 initiative, National Surfing Reserves. There are now almost 40 Surfing Reserves around the world enshrining iconic locations of cultural and environmental significance.   His advocacy has also included influential legislative and societal measures around Indigenous advancement, disabilities, antidiscrimination and mental health.  He is the founding Executive Officer of both Suicide Prevention Australia in 2001 (Life Member) and Postvention Australia, the national organisation for those bereaved by suicide.  He was the inaugural Chair of the Postvention Australia National Reference Group from 2018.   

While he has spent many years at sea, he gained national and global prominence in late 1990 as part of a Greenpeace International investigative maritime expedition to the frozen Soviet Artic nuclear testing site at Novaya Zemlya aboard the mothership, MV Greenpeace.  He worked for Greenpeace out of Amsterdam for around two years in his late twenties. He and the ship's multinational campaign crew were taken prisoners at gunpoint and detained by the KGB and released a week later by USSR Presidential pardon.  The action and global headlines led, in part, to a fresh Comprehensive Nuclear-Test-Ban Treaty (CTBT).

He attributes this watershed to a deeper lifelong commitment to addressing ecological issue and promoting a broader global awareness of threats to coastal and marine environments including the communities within proximity. He has led a national dialogue since 1991 on the need for a national approach to coastal zone management in Australia and in his semi-retirement is drafting a Coastal and Marine Bill for the Australian Parliament. He was honoured with the International Power of One Award in 1994 at the Scripps Institute of Oceanography for his pioneering role in coastal conservancy.  Since 2010, each year, he has been an Australia Day Ambassador travelling throughout NSW and the NT.

He remains unmarried, aligning to long held Theravada Buddhist traditions.  His family arrived as free settlers from Scotland into Moreton Bay north of the Gold Coast in 1842 while on his father’s side, his relationship to Byron Bay dates back to his Irish great, great grandfather who settled there in the late 1800’s.

References 

1959 births
Living people
Members of the Order of Australia
Australian conservationists
Australian non-fiction writers